Binod Kumar Roy (26 December 1944 – 20 June 2019) was an Indian Judge and former Chief Justice of three High Courts of India.

Career
Roy was born in 1944. He studied in Patna College and passed LL.B from Magadh University. He started his career in the Patna High Court as an advocate. Roy was elevated as a Judge of the Patna High Court on 31 October 1988. In April 1994 he was transferred to the Allahabad High Court. Roy became the Chief Justice of Punjab and Haryana High Court on 14 October 2002. He was subsequently moved to the Gauhati High Court and served there as the Chief Justice. On 30 September 2005, Justice Roy became the Chief Justice of the Sikkim High Court after retirement of Justice Radha Krishna Patra. He retired from the judgeship on 27 December 2006 and died on 20 June 2019.

References

1944 births
2019 deaths
Indian judges
Judges of the Patna High Court
Judges of the Allahabad High Court
Chief Justices of the Punjab and Haryana High Court
Chief Justices of the Gauhati High Court
Chief Justices of the Sikkim High Court
20th-century Indian judges
21st-century Indian judges
Magadh University alumni
Patna University alumni